Live from Dhaka is a 2016 Bangladeshi film written and directed by Abdullah Mohammad Saad and produced by Shamsur Rahman Alvi under the banner of Khelna Chobi Production. It feature Mostafa Monwar and Tasnova Tamanna in the lead roles. It is portrayed in black and white.

Synopsis 
Within the pressure-cooker reality of living and surviving in Dhaka, physically handicapped Sazzad has just lost all his money in a recent stock market crash. Struggling to survive and hounded by loan sharks, he no longer knows how to deal with his girlfriend Rehana, and his drug-addicted brother, Michael. As the pressure mounts, Sazzad becomes increasingly desperate to find any means to escape from Dhaka and his troubles, sinking deeper into the darkness of his soul.

Cast 
 Mostafa Monwar as Sazzad
 Tasnova Tamanna as Rehana
 Tanvir Ahmed Chowdhury
 Mosharraf Hossain
 Rony Sazzad
 Shimul Joy
 Ali Afjal Uzzal

Release and reception 
The film premiered in Singapore International Film Festival on December 2, 2016. It was released to theatres on March 29, 2019. At the 27th Singapore International Film Festival, it received Silver Screen Awards for Best Director and Best Performance (Mostafa Monwar).

References

External links 
 

2016 films
Bengali-language Bangladeshi films
2010s Bengali-language films